Toyland may refer to:

 Toyland (film), a 2007 German short film
 "Toyland" (comics), a 1948 Donald Duck comic book short story written and drawn by Carl Barks
 Toyland, an amusement park in Clifton Beach, Karachi.
"Toyland", a song from the 1903 operetta Babes in Toyland
 The world of the Noddy books, created by Enid Blyton
 Toyland, a toy area from the defunct Canadian chain Zellers
 Land of Toys or Toyland (original name: Paese dei balocchi), a fictional location in the Italian novel The Adventures of Pinocchio (1881-1883) and several adaptations of the story in other media

See also
 Babes in Toyland (disambiguation)